The 2017 UK Music Video Awards were held on 26 October 2017 to recognise the best in music videos from United Kingdom and worldwide. The nominations were announced on 21 September 2017.

Video of the Year

Video genre categories

Craft and technical categories

Live and interactive categories

Individual and company categories

References

External links
Official website

UK Music Video Awards
UK Music Video Awards
UK Music Video Awards